Dynamic International University College is a private university located in Addis Ababa, Ethiopia. It was established in 2005.

References
 Ethiopia - Universities

Educational institutions established in 2005
Universities and colleges in Ethiopia
Education in Addis Ababa
2005 establishments in Ethiopia